James Street (10 March 1839 – 17 September 1906) was an English cricketer who played for Surrey between 1863 and 1878. A round arm fast bowler, he took 534 of his 540 first-class wickets for Surrey. Subsequently he became an umpire, appearing in that role between 1873 and 1899, but in only two matches before 1877. He umpired in one Test match, that between England and Australia at The Oval on 11 and 12 August 1890.

He did not become a regular in the Surrey side until 1868, and even after he had established himself his bowling figures were not especially good by the standards of the time. His best seasons were 1872 and 1873, when he took 60 wickets at an average of 15.11 and then 70 at 17.57.

His brother, George Street, and his son, Alfred Street, were both umpires, his son also playing for Surrey as well as surpassing his father by umpiring in seven Tests.

References 
CricketArchive
Cricinfo profile including his obituary from Wisden

1839 births
1906 deaths
English cricketers
Surrey cricketers
English Test cricket umpires
English cricketers of 1864 to 1889
Surrey Club cricketers
Players of the South cricketers